This is a list of islands of the Maldives. There are 1,192 in total, of which 187 are inhabited. They are listed by administrative division/atoll. The islands are divided into:
Inhabited islands- those officially recognized as towns, villages, fishing, and farming communities with permanent human habitation. They all have an island office and island chiefs (councilor and "katheeb").
Uninhabited islands- islands with no permanent human habitations. They are sometimes used for agricultural and industrial purposes, and more recently as tourist resorts and picnic islands. Some of these islands are valuable breeding grounds for various species of seabirds and sea turtles.
Disappeared islands- islands which during recorded history, have been completely eroded away, claimed by the sea due to the sea level rise or assimilated by other islands. Some of these islands were previously inhabited and have been important in the history of the country. Some natural atolls are named after them (islands of Thiladhoo and Addu after which Thiladhunmati and Addu atoll are named respectively) while others are thought to have been the sites of the first settlements in the Maldives (Ihadhoo- meaning seen first and possibly the first settlement of the Maldives).

Islands by area size
This list ranks the top 10 islands of the Maldives by area.

Some islands in the Maldives, although geographically one island, is divided into two administrative islands (for example, Gan and Maandhoo in Laamu Atoll). For such cases, this list ranks the entire (combined) area of the geographical island.

Inland water bodies such as lakes and ponds are included in the total area.

Note: The combined area of Malé, Hulhulé and Hulhumalé exceeds 9 km2, which surpasses the area of the largest natural island in the Maldives. However, these three as a whole are considered to be a city, not an island.

North Thiladhunmathi (HA) (Haa Alif Atoll)

Inhabited Islands
Baarah
Dhiddhoo (capital of Haa Alifu Atoll)
Filladhoo
Hoarafushi
Ihavandhoo
Kelaa
Maarandhoo
Mulhadhoo
Muraidhoo
Thakandhoo
Thuraakunu
Uligamu
Utheemu
Vashafaru

Uninhabited Islands
Alivaadhoo
Alidhuffarufinolhu
Berinmadhoo
Beenaafushi

Gaafushi
Gaamathikulhudhoo
Gallandhoo
Govvaafushi
Hathifushi
Huraa
Huvahandhoo
Innafinolhu
Kudafinolhu
Maafahi
Maafinolhu
Madulu
Manafaru
Matheerah
Medhafushi
Mulidhoo
Naridhoo
Umaraiffinolhu
Ungulifinolhu
Vagaaru
Velifinolhu

Disappeared Islands
Gasthirifinolhu
Gudhanfushi
Na
Thiladhoo (now part of Dhiddhoo)
Thinadhoo

South Thiladhunmathi (HDh) (Haa Dhaalu Atoll)

Inhabited Islands
Hanimaadhoo
Finey 
Naivaadhoo
Nolhivaranfaru
Nellaidhoo
Nolhivaram
Kurinbi
Kulhudhuffushi City (capital of Haa Dhaalu Atoll and that of the Mathi-Uthuru Province)
Kumundhoo
Neykurendhoo
Vaikaradhoo
Makunudhoo
Hirimaradhoo

Uninhabited Islands
Bodunaagoashi
Dafaru Fasgandu
Dhorukanduhuraa
Faridhoo
Fenboahuraa
Hirinaidhoo
Hondaafushi
Hondaidhoo
Innafushi
Kanamana
Kattalafushi
Kaylakunu
Kudamuraidhoo
Kudanaagoashi
Kurinbi
Maavaidhoo
Muiri
Rasfushi
Ruffushi
Vaikaramuraidhoo
Veligandu
Dhipparafushi
Kunburudhoo (previously inhabited)

Disappeared Islands
Bileddhoo

North Miladhunmadulu (Funadhuffaaru) (Sh) (Shaviyani Atoll)

Inhabited Islands
Bileffahi
Feevah
Feydhoo
Foakaidhoo
Funadhoo (capital of Shaviyani Atoll)
Goidhoo
Kanditheemu
Komandoo
Lhaimagu
Maaungoodhoo
Maroshi
Milandhoo
Narudhoo
Noomaraa

Uninhabited Islands
Bis Huraa
Dhigu Rah
Dhiguvelldhoo
Dholhiyadhoo
Dholhiyadhoo Kudarah
Dhonveli-huraa
Ekasdhoo
Eriyadhoo
Farukolhu
Fushifaru
Firunbaidhoo
Gaakoshinbi
Gallaidhoo
Hirubadhoo
Hurasfaruhuraa
Kabaalifaru
Keekimini
Killissafaruhuraa
Kudalhaimendhoo
Madidhoo
Madikurendhdhoo
Mathikomandoo
Maakandoodhoo
Medhurah
Medhukunburudhoo
Migoodhoo
Naainfarufinolhu
Nalandhoo
Naruibudhoo
Neyo
Vagaru

Disappeared Islands
Gallaidhookudarah
Gonaafushi
Killisfaru'rahgandu

South Miladhunmadulu (N) (Noonu Atoll)

Inhabited Islands
Foddhoo
Henbandhoo
Holhudhoo
Kendhikulhudhoo
Kudafari
Landhoo
Lhohi
Maafaru
Maalhendhoo
Magoodhoo
Manadhoo (capital of Noonu Atoll)
Miladhoo
Velidhoo

Uninhabited Islands
Badadhidhdhoo
Bodufushi
Bodulhaimendhoo
Bomasdhoo
Burehifasdhoo
Dheefuram
Dhelibehuraa
Dhekenanfaru
Dhigurah
Dhonaerikandoodhoo
Ekulhivaru
Farumuli
Felivaru
Fodhidhipparu
Fushivelavaru
Gallaidhoofushi
Gemendhoo
Goanbilivaadhoo
Holhumeedhoo now part of Holhudhoo
Huivani
Hulhudhdhoo
Huvadhumaavattaru
Iguraidhoo
Kuddarah
Kadimmahuraa
Kalaidhoo
Karimma
Kedhivaru
Koalaa
Kolhufushi
Kudafunafaru
Kudafushi
Kunnamaloa
Kuramaadhoo
Kuredhivaru
Loafaru
Maafunafaru
Maakurandhoo
Maavelavaru
Medhafushi
Medhufaru
Maafarudhoo
Minaavaru
Orimasvaru
Orivaru
Raafushi
Raalulaakolhu
Randheli
Thaburudhoo
Thaburudhuffushi
Tholhendhoo
Thoshigadukolhu
Vattaru
Vavathi
Vihafarufinolhu

Disappeared Islands
 Malefushi
 Vihafarufushi
 Kulhimila

North Maalhosmadulu (R) (Raa Atoll)

Inhabited Islands
Alifushi
Angolhitheemu
Fainu
Hulhudhuffaaru
Inguraidhoo
Innamaadhoo
Dhuvaafaru
Kinolhas
Maakurathu
Maduvvaree
Meedhoo (vice capital of Raa Atoll) 
Rasgetheemu
Rasmaadhoo
Ungoofaaru (capital of Raa Atoll)
Vaadhoo

Uninhabited Islands
Aarah
Arilundhoo
Badaveri
Bodufarufinolhu
Bodufenmaaenboodhoo
Bodufushi
Boduhaiykodi
Boduhuraa
Ekurufushi
Etthingili
Dhigali
Dhoragali
Dheburidheythereyvaadhoo
Dhikkurendhdhoo
Dhinnaafushi
Faarafushi
Fasmendhoo
Fenfushi
Filaidhoo
Fuggiri
Furaveri
Gaaudoodhoo
Giraavaru
Goyyafaru
Goiymaru
Guboshi
Hiraveri
Hulhudhoo
Huruvalhi
Ifuru
Kandholhudhoo
Kaddogadu
Kothaifaru
Kottafaru
Kottefaru
Kudafushi
Kudahaiykodi
Kudakurathu
Kudalhosgiri
Kudathulhaadhoo
Kukulhudhoo
Kuroshigiri
Lhaanbugali
Lhaanbugau
Lhohi
Liboakandhoo
Lundhufushi
Maafaru
Maamigili
Maamunagaufinolhu
Maanenfushi
Maashigiri
Madivaafaru
Mahidhoo
Meedhupparu
Muravandhoo
Mullaafushi
Neyo
Thaavathaa
Ugulu
Uthurumaafaru
Vaffushihuraa
Vandhoo
Veyvah
Viligili
Wakkaru

Disappeared Islands
Boduhuraa
Ethigandujehihuraa
Fasgandufarufinolhu
Furaverumeehungemaafaru
Gaaviligiligaathurah
Huruvalhigaathurah
Inguraidhookudadhiffushi
Kandhoomeehungelhaanbugali
Kurredhupparu

South Maalhosmadulu (B) (Baa Atoll)

Inhabited Islands
Dharavandhoo
Dhonfanu
Eydhafushi (capital of Baa Atoll)
Fehendhoo
Fulhadhoo
Goidhoo
Hithaadhoo
Kamadhoo
Kendhoo
Kihaadhoo
Kudarikilu
Maalhos
Thulhaadhoo

Uninhabited Islands
Ahivaffushi
Aidhoo
Anhenunfushi
Bathalaa
Bodufinolhu
Boifushi
Dhakendhoo
Dhandhoo
Dhigufaruvinagandu
Dhunikolhu
Enboodhoo
Fehenfushi
Finolhas
Fonimagoodhoo
Fulhadhoorah kairi finonolhu
Funadhoo
Gaagandufaruhuraa
Gaavillingili
Gemendhoo
Hanifaru
Hanifarurah
Hibalhidhoo
Hirundhoo
Horubadhoo
Hulhudhoo
Innafushi
Kanifusheegaathu finolhu
Kanifushi
Kashidhoogiri
Keyodhoo
Kihaadhufaru
Kihavah-huravalhi
Kudadhoo
Kunfunadhoo
Landaagiraavaru
Lunfares
Maaddoo
Maafushi
Maamaduvvari
Maarikilu
Madhirivaadhoo
Medhufinolhu
Mendhoo
Milaidhoo
Miriandhoo
Muddhoo
Muthaafushi
Nibiligaa
Olhugiri
Thiladhoo
Ufuligiri
Undoodhoo
Vakkaru
Velivarufinolhu
Veyofushee
Vinaneih-faruhuraa
Voavah

Disappeared Islands
Boadhaafusheefinolhu
Dhoogandufinolhu
Dhorukandu'dhekunuhuraa
Dhorukandu'uthuruhuraa
Goidhoohuraa
Hithadhoohuraa
Hithadookudarah
Kalhunaiboli
Lhavadhookandurah
Velavaru

Faadhippolhu (Lh) (Lhaviyani Atoll)

Inhabited Islands
Hinnavaru
Kurendhoo
Maafilaafushi
Naifaru (capital of Lhaviyani Atoll)
Olhuvelifushi

Uninhabited Islands
Aligau
Bahurukabeeru
Bodhuhuraa
Bodufaahuraa
Bodugaahuraa
Dhidhdhoo
Dhirubaafushi
Diffushi
Faadhoo
Fainuaadham-Huraa
Fehigili
Felivaru (capital of the Uthuru Province)
Fushifaru
Gaaerifaru
Govvaafushi
Hadoolaafushi
Hiriyadhoo
Hudhufushi
Huravalhi
Kalhumanjehuraa
Kalhuoiyfinolhu
Kanifushi
Kanuhuraa
Komandoo
Kudadhoo
Kuredhdhoo
Lhohi
Lhossalafushi
Maabinhuraa
Maavaafushi
Madhiriguraidhoo
Madivaru
Maduvvari
Maidhoo
Mayyafushi
Medhadhihuraa
Medhafushi
Meedhaahuraa
Mey-yyaafushi
Musleygihuraa
Ookolhufinolhu
Raiyruhhuraa
Selhlhifushi
Thilamaafushi
Varihuraa
Vavvaru
Veligadu
Veyvah
Vihafarufinolhu

Disappeared Islands
Aligauhuraagandu
Bahurukabiru
Bulhalaafushi
Ruhelhifushi

Male' (K) Atoll (Kaafu Atoll)

Inhabited Islands
Dhiffushi
Gaafaru
Gulhi
Guraidhoo
Himmafushi
Hulhumalé
Huraa
Kaashidhoo
Malé (capital of the Maldives)
Maafushi (capital of the Medhu-Uthuru Province)
Thulusdhoo (capital of Kaafu Atoll)
Vilimalé (formerly known as Vilingili)

Uninhabited Islands
Aarah
Akirifushi
Asdhoo
Baros
Bandos
Biyaadhoo
Bodubandos
Bodufinolhu
Boduhithi
Boduhuraa
Bolifushi
Dhigufinolhu
Dhoonidhoo
 Ehrruh-haa
Enboodhoo
Enboodhoofinolhu
Eriyadhoo
Farukolhufushi
Feydhoofinolhu
Fihalhohi
Funadhoo
Furan-nafushi
Gasfinolhu
Giraavaru
Girifushi
Gulheegaathuhuraa
Helengeli
Henbadhoo
Hulhulé
Huraagandu
Ihuru
Ithaafushi 2017 Reclaimed Island in south male atoll
Kagi
Kalhuhuraa
Kandoomaafushi
Kanduoih-giri
Kanifinolhu
Kanuhuraa
Kodhipparu
Kudabandos
Kudafinolhu
Kudahithi
Kudahuraa
Lankanfinolhu
Lankanfushi
Lhohifushi
Lhosfushi
Maadhoo
Madivaru
Mahaanaélhihuraa
Makunudhoo
Makunufushi
Maniyafushi
Medhufinolhu
Meerufenfushi
Nakachchaafushi
Olhahali
Olhuveli
Oligandufinolhu
Ran-naalhi
Rasfari
Thanburudhoo
Thilafushi
Thulhaagiri
Vaadhoo
Vaagali
Vabbinfaru
Vabboahuraa
Vammaafushi
Velassaru
Velifaru
Veliganduhuraa
Vihamanaafushi
 Villingilimathidhahuraa
Villingilivau
Ziyaaraiffushi

Disappeared Islands
Bisfushi
Gaadhoo (now part of Hulhulé)
Gulhifalhurah
Kaashidhookudarah
Kaddhipparu
Kuda Malé (now part of Malé)
Kudavattaru
Kuredhivinahuraagandu
Oiidhuni
Dhabilalhidhoo

North Ari Atoll (AA) (Alif Alif Atoll)

Inhabited Islands
Bodufolhudhoo
Feridhoo
Himandhoo
Maalhos
Mathiveri
Rasdhoo  (capital of Alif Alif Atoll)
Thoddoo
Ukulhas
Fesdhoo

Uninhabited Islands
Alikoirah
Bathalaa
Beyrumadivaru
Dhin-nolhufinolhu
Ellaidhoo
Etheramadivaru
Fusfinolhu
Fushi
Gaagandu
Gaathufushi
Gangehi
Halaveli
Kandholhudhoo
Kudafolhudhoo
Kuramathi
Maagaa
Maayyafushi
Madivarufinolhu
Madoogali
Mathivereefinolhu
Meerufenfushi
Mushimasgali
Rasdhoo madivaru
Velidhoo
Veligandu
Vihamaafaru

Disappeared Islands
Bathalaamaagau
Faanumadugau
Fushifarurah
Gaahuraafussari
Gonaagau
Huraadhoo
Kubuladhi
Kudafalhufushi
Kurolhi
Orimasfushi
Ukulhasgaathufushi

South Ari Atoll (ADh) (Alif Dhaal Atoll)

Inhabited Islands
Dhangethi
Dhiddhoo
Dhigurah
Fenfushi
Haggnaameedhoo 
Kunburudhoo
Maamingili
Mahibadhoo (capital of Alif Dhaal Atoll)
Mandhoo
Omadhoo

Uninhabited Islands
Alikoirah
Angaagaa
Ariadhoo
Athurugau
Bodufinolhu
Bodukaashihuraa
Bulhaaholhi
Dhehasanulunboihuraa
Dhiddhoofinolhu
Dhiffushi
Dhiggiri
Enboodhoo
Finolhu
Gasfinolhu
Heenfaru
Hiyafushi
Hukurudhoo
Hurasdhoo
Huruelhi
Huvahendhoo
Innafushi
Kalhuhandhihuraa
Kudadhoo
Kudarah
Maafushivaru
Machchafushi
Medhufinolhu
Mirihi
Moofushi
Nalaguraidhoo
Rahddhiggaa
Rangali
Rangalifinolhu
Rashukolhuhuraa
Theluveligaa
Tholhifushi
Thundufushi
Vakarufalhi
Vilamendhoo
Villingili
Villinglivaru

Disappeared Islands
Aafinolhu
Aufushi
Faruhukuruvalhi
Hithifushi
Huraadhoo
Kalaafushi
Kudadhoo
Medhafushi
Theyofulhihuraa

Felidhu Atoll (V) (Vaavu Atoll)

Inhabited Islands
Felidhoo (capital of Vaavu Atoll)
Fulidhoo
Keyodhoo
Rakeedhoo
Thinadhoo

Uninhabited Islands
Aarah
Alimathaa
Anbaraa
Bodumohoraa
Dhiggiri
Foiytheyobodufushi
Fussfaruhuraa
Hingaahuraa
Hulhidhoo
Kuda-anbaraa
Kudhiboli
Kunawashi
Maafussaru
Medhugiri
Thunduhuraa
Raggadu
Ruhhurihuraa
Vashugiri
Vattaru'rah

Disappeared Islands
Aahuraa
Hinagaakalhi
Kahanbufushi
Kalhuhuraa
Kolhudhuffushi
Kudadhiggaru
Kudafussfaruhuraa

Mulakatholhu (M) (Meemu Atoll)

Inhabited Islands
 Mulak
 Dhiggaru
 Kolhufushi
 Maduvvaree
 Muli (capital of Meemu Atoll)
 Naalaafushi
 Raimmandhoo
 Veyvah

Uninhabited Islands
Boahuraa
Dhekunuboduveli
Dhiththudi
Erruh-huraa
Fenboafinolhu
Fenfuraaveli
Gaahuraa
Gasveli
Gongalu Huraa
Haafushi
Hakuraahuraa
Hurasveli
Kekuraalhuveli
Kudadhigandu
Kurali
Kudausfushi
Maahuraa
Maalhaveli
Maausfushi
Medhufushi
Raabandhihuraa
Seedhihuraa
Seedhihuraaveligandu
Thuvaru
Uthuruboduveli
Veriheybe

Disappeared Islands
Boduvela
Dhonveliganduhuraa
Vah'huruvalhi

North Nilandhe Atoll (F) (Faafu Atoll)

Inhabited Islands
Bileddhoo
Dharanboodhoo
Feeali
Magoodhoo
Nilandhoo (capital of Faafu Atoll)

Uninhabited Islands
Badidhiffusheefinolhu
Dhiguvarufinolhu
Enbulufushi
Faanuvaahuraa
Filitheyo
 Himithi
Jinnathugau
Kandoomoonufushi
Maafushi
Maavaruhuraa
Madivaruhuraa
Makunueri
Minimasgali
Villingilivarufinolhu
Voshimasfalhuhuraa

Disappeared Islands
Boduhuraa
Dhiguvaru
Feealeehuraa
Hukeraa
Kudafari
Madivarufinolhu

South Nilandhe Atoll (Dh) (Dhaalu Atoll)

Inhabited Islands
Bandidhoo
Gemendhoo
Hulhudheli
Kudahuvadhoo (capital of Dhaalu Atoll)
Maaenboodhoo
Meedhoo
Rinbudhoo
Vaanee

Uninhabited Islands
Aloofushi
Bodufushi
Bulhalafushi
Dhebaidhoo
Dhoores
Enboodhoofushi
Faandhoo
Gaadhiffushi
Hiriyanfushi
Hudhufusheefinolhu
Hulhuvehi
Issari
Kandinma
Kanneiyfaru
Kedhigandu
Kiraidhoo
Lhohi
Maadheli
Maafushi
Maagau
Maléfaru
Meedhuffushi
Minimasgali
Naibukaloabodufushi
Olhufushi
Olhuveli
Thilabolhufushi
Thinhuraa
Uddhoo
Valla
Vallalhohi
Velavaroo (Velavaru)
Vonmuli

Disappeared Islands
Maadhelihuraa
Madivaru
Madivaruhuraa
Naibukaloakudafushi

Kolhumadulu (Th) (Thaa Atoll)

Inhabited Islands
Burunee
Vilufushi
Madifushi
Dhiyamingili
Guraidhoo
Gaadhiffushi
Thimarafushi
Veymandoo (capital of Thaa Atoll)
Kinbidhoo
Omadhoo
Hirilandhoo
Kandoodhoo
Vandhoo

Uninhabited Islands
Bodufinolhu
Bodurehaa
Dhiffushi
Dhonanfushi
Dhururehaa
Ekuruffushi
Elaa
Fenfushi
Fenmeerufushi
Fonaddoo
Fondhoo
Fonidhaani
Fushi
Gaalee
Gaathurehaa
Hathifushi
Hiriyanfushi
Hodelifushi
Hulhiyanfushi
Kaaddoo
Kadufushi
Kafidhoo
Kakolhas
Kalhudheyfushi
Kalhufahalafushi
Kandaru
Kani
Kanimeedhoo
Kolhufushi-1
Kolhufushi-2
Kudadhoo
Kudakaaddoo
Kudakibidhoo
Kurandhuvaru
Kuredhifushi
Lhavaddoo
Maagulhi
Maalefushi
Mathidhoo
Medhafushi
Olhudhiyafushi
Olhufushi
Olhufushi-finolhu
Olhugiri
Ruhththibirah
Thinkolhufushi
Ufuriyaa
Usfushi
Vanbadhi

Disappeared Islands
Filaagandu
Kandoodhookuraa
Keyovah'rah
Kolhuvanbadhi
Kudaburunee
Kudadhiyanmigili

Hadhdhunmathi (L) (Laamu Atoll)

Inhabited Islands
Dhanbidhoo
Fonadhoo (capital of Laamu Atoll)
Gan (capital of the Mathi-Dhekunu Province)
Hithadhoo 

 Isdhoo

Kunahandhoo
Maabaidhoo
Maamendhoo
Maavah
Mundoo

Uninhabited Islands
Athahédha
Berasdhoo
Bileitheyrahaa
Bodufenrahaa
Bodufinolhu
Boduhuraa
Bodumaabulhali
Bokaiffushi
Dhekunu Vinagandu
Faés
Fonagaadhoo
Fushi
Gaadhoo
Gasfinolhu
Guraidhoo
Hanhushi
Hedha
Holhurahaa
Hulhimendhoo
Hulhisdhoo
Hulhiyandhoo
Kaddhoo
Kalhuhuraa
Kalhaidhoo
Kandaru
Kudafares
Kudafushi
Kudahuraa
Kudakalhaidhoo
Kukurahaa
Maakaulhuveli
Maandhoo
Maaveshi
Mahakanfushi
Medhafushi
Medhoo
Medhufinolhu
Medhuvinagandu
Munyafushi
Olhutholhu
Olhuveli
Thunburi
Thundudhoshufushi Nolhoo/Thundudhoshufinolhu
Uthuruvinagandu
Uvadhevifushi
Vadinolhu
Veligandufinolhu
Ziyaaraiffushi

Disappeared Islands
Aahuraa
Aarahaa
Boduboahuraa
Bodumahigulhi
Dhurudhandaaikandaagerah
Hassanbey'rah
Ihadhoo
Kerendhoo
Kokrahaaoiyythaafinolhu
Kudamahigulhi
Sathugalu
Vadinolhuhuraa

North Huvadhu Atoll (GA) (Gaafu Alif Atoll)

Inhabited Islands
Dhaandhoo
Dhevvadhoo
Gemanafushi
Kanduhulhudhoo
Kolamaafushi
Kondey
Maamendhoo
Nilandhoo
Villingili (capital of Gaafu Alif Atoll)

Uninhabited Islands
Araigaiththaa
 Baavandhoo
Baberaahuttaa
Bakeiththaa
Beyruhuttaa
Beyrumaddoo
Bihuréhaa
Boaddoo
Bodéhuttaa
Budhiyahuttaa
Dhevvalaabadhoo
Dhevvamaagalaa
Dhigémaahuttaa
Dhigudhoo
Dhigurah
Dhiyadhoo
Dhonhuseenahuttaa
Falhumaafushi
Falhuverrehaa
Farudhulhudhoo
Fénéhuttaa
Fenrahaa
Fenrahaahuttaa
Funadhoovillingili
Funamaddoo
Galamadhoo
Haagevillaa
Hadahaa
Hagedhoo
Heenamaagalaa
Hirihuttaa
Hithaadhoo
Hithaadhoogalaa
Hulhimendhoo
Hunadhoo
Hurendhoo
Idimaa
Innaréhaa
Kalhehuttaa
Kalhudhiréhaa
Kanduvillingili
Keesseyréhaa
Kendheraa
Koduhuttaa
Kondeymatheelaabadhoo
Kondeyvillingili
Kudalafari
Kuddoo
Kudhébondeyyo
Kudhéfehélaa
Kudhéhuttaa
Kureddhoo
Lhossaa
Maadhiguvaru
Maaféhélaa
Maagehuttaa
Maakanaarataa
Maamutaa
Maarandhoo
Maaréhaa
Mahaddhoo
Maththidhoo
Maththuréhaa
Médhuburiyaa
Médhuhuttaa
Medhuréhaa
Melaimu
Meradhoo
Minimensaa
Munaagala
Munandhoo
Odagallaa
Raaverrehaa
Rinbidhoo
Thinrukéréhaa
Uhéréhaa
Viligillaa
Vodamulaa

Disappeared Islands
Aligalehuttaa
Falhukolhurataa
Galuréhaa
Havvaadhiyekuyyaakéeranahthedhinerehaa
Kakadiherehuttaa
Odafuttaa
Parehulhedhoo
Thabaidhoo
Vagaathugalfuttaa
Viligili

South Huvadhu Atoll (GDh) (Gaafu Dhaalu Atoll)

Inhabited Islands
Fares-Maathodaa
Fiyoaree
Gaddhoo
Hoandeddhoo
Madaveli
Nadellaa
Rathafandhoo
Thinadhoo (capital of Gaafu Dhaalu Atoll and of the Medhu-Dhekunu Province)
Vaadhoo

Uninhabited Islands
Aakiraahuttaa
Athihuttaa
Badéfodiyaa
Barahuttaa
Baulhagallaa
Bodehuttaa
Bodérehaa
Bolimathaidhoo
Dhékanbaa
Dhérékudhéhaa
Dhigérehaa
Dhigulaabadhoo
Dhinmanaa
Dhiyanigilllaa
Dhonigallaa
Dhoonirehaa
Ehéhuttaa
Ekélondaa
Faahuttaa
Faanahuttaa
Faathiyéhuttaa
Faréhulhudhoo
Farukoduhuttaa
Fatéfandhoo
Femunaidhoo
Fenevenehuttaa
Féreythavilingillaa
Fonahigillaa
Gaazeeraa
Gan
Gehémaagalaa
Gehévalégalaa
Golhaallaa
Haadhoo
Hadahaahuttaa
Hakandhoo
Handaidhoo
Havoddaa
Havodigalaa
Hevaahulhudhoo
Hiyanigilihuttaa
Hoothodéyaa
Hulheddhoo
Hunigondiréhaa
Isdhoo
Kaadeddhoo
Kaafaraataa
Kaafénaa
Kaalhéhutta
Kaalhéhuttaa
Kaashidhoo
Kadahalagalaa
Kadévaaréhaa
Kalhaidhoo
Kalhéfalaa
Kalhehigillaa
Kalhéhuttaa
Kalhéréhaa
Kanandhoo
Kandeddhoo
Kannigilla
Kautihulhudhoo
Kélaihuttaa
Keraminthaa
Kereddhoo
Kéyhuvadhoo
Kodaanahuttaa
Kodédhoo
Kodégalaa
Koduhutigallaa
Kodurataa
Konontaa
Kudhé-ehivakaa
Kudhéhulheddhoo
Kudhélifadhoo
Kudhérataa
Kudhukélaihuttaa
Kurikeymaahuttaa
Laihaa
Lifadhoo
Lonudhoo
Lonudhoohuttaa
Maadhoo
Maaéhivakaa
Maagodiréhaa
Maahéraa
Maahutigallaa
Maarehaa
Maavaarulaa
Maaveddhoo
Maguddhoo
Mainaadhoo
Mallaaréhaa
Mariyankoyya Rataa
Mathaidhoo
Mathihuttaa
Mathikera-nanahuththaa
Meehunthibenehuttaa
Menthandhoo
Meragihuttaa
Meyragilla
Mudhimaahuttaa
Odavarrehaa
Oinigillaa
Olhimuntaa
Olhurataa
Raabadaaféhéreehataa
Rahadhoo
Ralhéodagallaa
Reddhahuttaa
Rodhevarrehaa
Thelehuttaa
Thinehuttaa
Ukurihuttaa
Ulégalaa
Vairéyaadhoo
Vatavarrehaa
Veraavillingillaa
Villigalaa

Disappeared Islands
Boduréhaabokkoyyaa
Hevanaréhaa
Isdhuvaa
Maaodagalaa
Keyhuvadhoo
Kudakokeréhaa
Kudhéhaadhu
Uheréhaa

Fuvahmulah (Gn) (Gnaviyani Atoll)

Inhabited Islands
 Fuvahmulah (capital of Gnaviyani Atoll):

Taking into consideration the geography of the island along with its size and population, the 8 wards of Fuvahmulah are officially recognised as administrative divisions which act as the replacement for islands in other atolls. They are  Dhadimago, Diguvāndo, Hōdhado, Mādhado, Miskimmago, Funādo, Mālegan, Dūndigan. For each ward a chief ('Katheeb') was appointed as in charge of the day-to-day affairs of the respective ward and held accountable for an Atoll chief. According to the Decentralisation Act 2010 an island council too have to be elected for each division of the island. There was formerly a ninth ward named Dhashokubaa which was merged with Miskimmago.

Addu Atoll (Seenu Atoll)

Inhabited Islands
 Hithadhoo (capital of Addu City and of the Dhekunu Province)
 Maradhoo
 Maradhoo-Feydhoo (part of Maradhoo island)
 Feydhoo
 Hulhudhoo (Addu)
 Meedhoo (Addu)

Uninhabited Islands
Aboohéra - (within or part of Hithadhoo)
Boda Hajara
Bodahéraganda
Dhigihéra
Dhiyarudi
Fahikédéhéraganda
Gan
Gaukendi - (within or part of Hithadhoo)
Geskalhahéra
Gomahera
Hankedé
Hankedé Hajara
Herathera
Hikahera
Ismehela Hera
Kafathalhaa Héra
Kabboahera
Kandihera
Kédévaahéra
Koahera
Kandihéréganda
Koattay
Maahera
Maamendhoo -(within or part of Hithadhoo)
Madihéra
Mulikédé
Odessau-boda - (within or part of Hithadhoo)
Odessau-kudhu - (within or part of Hithadhoo)
Rasgedhara - (within or part of Hithadhoo)
Rujjehera - (within or part of Hithadhoo)
Savaaheli
Vashahéra
Villingili 
Naanu

Disappeared Islands
Aminaamanike Heraganda
Feylihikkikudhumaahéra
Geskalhahéra-kudakalhahéra
Thinruh Heragada

See also
List of islands in the Indian Ocean

References

 
Islands of the Indian Ocean
Islands